Elijah Thomas (born October 10, 1996) is an American professional basketball player. He played college basketball for the Clemson Tigers and the Texas A&M Aggies.

Early life and high school career
Thomas grew up in South Dallas and befriended Jordan Mickey in elementary school. When Deion Sanders opened Prime Prep Academy, both Mickey and Thomas decided to join. Prior to his junior season, Thomas transferred to Lancaster High School in Lancaster, Texas. In the final game of the regular season, he had 39 points and 20 rebounds as Lancaster defeated MacArthur High School 87-66. Thomas was named District 15-4A most valuable player as a junior. As a senior, he helped the team win the Class 5A state championship and averaged 26 points and 14 rebounds per game. Ranked the No. 29 recruit in his class according to ESPN, he committed to Texas A&M, the first school to offer him a scholarship, on October 21, 2014. Thomas chose the Aggies over offers from Illinois, LSU, Oklahoma State and SMU.

College career
Thomas averaged 3.8 points and 2.5 rebounds per game as a freshman, but saw his minutes decline due to the emergence of Tyler Davis. On January 6, 2016, he announced he was transferring to Clemson after taking visits to Nebraska and Arizona. As a sophomore, Thomas averaged 7.5 points and 4.2 rebounds per game. On November 24, 2017, he posted career-highs of 26 points and 16 rebounds in an 84-77 victory over Texas Southern. He averaged 10.7 points, 8.1 rebounds, and 2.3 blocks per game as a junior, shooting 56 percent from the floor. Thomas was named to the ACC All-Defensive Team. He had nine double-doubles and helped the Tigers reach to the Sweet 16 of the NCAA Tournament for the first time since 1997. As a senior, Thomas averaged 13 points, 7.8 rebounds, and 2.2 blocks per game. He was named to the ACC All-Defensive Team for the second straight season, as well as Honorable Mention All-ACC. He was the seventh Clemson player to compile 900 points, 600 rebounds and 150 blocks.

Professional career
After going undrafted in the 2019 NBA draft, Thomas joined the Charlotte Hornets for NBA Summer League. On July 18, 2019, he signed his first professional contract with Wonju DB Promy of the Korean Basketball League. He did not appear in a game for the team. On January 12, 2020, Thomas signed with Larisa of the Greek Basket League. In five games, he averaged 6.4 points and 4.2 rebounds per game.

On January 2, 2021, he signed with Kyiv-Basket of the Ukrainian Basketball SuperLeague. On January 22, 2021, he signed with Bnei Herzliya of the Israeli Basketball Premier League. 

In October 2021, Thomas joined the Windy City Bulls after a successful tryout. He was waived on December 25th.

On February 18, 2022, he signed with Taoyuan Leopards of the T1 League.

On January 18, 2023, Thomas signed with Kaohsiung Aquas of the T1 League. On March 7, Kaohsiung Aquas terminated the contract relationship with Thomas.

References

External links
Clemson Tigers bio

1996 births
Living people
American expatriate basketball people in Greece
American expatriate basketball people in Japan
American expatriate basketball people in Taiwan
American men's basketball players
Basketball players from Dallas
Clemson Tigers men's basketball players
Earth Friends Tokyo Z players
Larisa B.C. players
Power forwards (basketball)
Taoyuan Leopards players
T1 League imports
Texas A&M Aggies men's basketball players
Windy City Bulls players
Kaohsiung Aquas players